Laura Lynne Beeman (born April 16, 1968) is an American college basketball coach who is currently the head women's basketball coach at the University of Hawaii.

Early life and education
Born and raised in San Bernardino, California, Beeman attended San Gorgonio High School in ninth grade before transferring to San Bernardino High School and graduating in 1986. She redshirted a year due to a knee injury, then played 24 games for then-Division II UC Riverside in the 1987–88 season under coach Nancy Simpson. Beeman averaged 2.1 points and 1.2 rebounds.

Beeman then transferred to then-Division III Cal State San Bernardino and played from 1989 to 1991. As a sophomore in 1989–90, Beeman averaged 7.3 points and 3.0 rebounds and helped Cal State San Bernardino to a 24–4 season and a berth in the NCAA Tournament. In 1990–91, her junior year, Beeman averaged 6.5 points and 3.7 rebounds. Beeman left the team after that season and graduated with a degree in business marketing in 1992.

Coaching career
Also enrolling as a graduate student, Beeman became a women's basketball  assistant coach at the University of Redlands in 1992. She completed her M.Ed. in counseling in 1994.

At the junior college level, Beeman became a women's basketball  assistant coach at Mt. San Antonio College in 1994. She also enrolled at Azusa Pacific University that year and earned a master's degree in physical education in 1996. Beeman also was promoted to head coach at Mt. San Antonio in 1995. At Mt. San Antonio, Beeman led the program to four CCCAA titles (2004, 2006, 2007, 2008), ten South Coast Conference titles, and a 390–110 record in 15 seasons from 1995 to 2010.

Beeman was an assistant coach for the Los Angeles Sparks of the WNBA under Michael Cooper in the 2008 and 2009 seasons. From 2010 to 2012, Beeman was an assistant coach at USC, again under Cooper.

In 2012, the University of Hawaii at Manoa hired Beeman as head coach for Hawaii Rainbow Wahine basketball. In eleven seasons, Beeman led Hawai'i to four WNIT appearances (2013, 2014, 2015, 2019) and three NCAA tournament appearances (2016, 2022, 2023). Hawaii won the Big West Conference regular season title in 2015 and Big West tournament in 2016, 2022 and 2023.

Head coaching record

NCAA

References 

1968 births
Living people
American women's basketball coaches
Hawaii Rainbow Wahine basketball coaches
Junior college women's basketball coaches in the United States
USC Trojans women's basketball coaches
Azusa Pacific University alumni
University of Redlands alumni
California State University, San Bernardino alumni
Los Angeles Sparks coaches
University of California, Riverside alumni
Sportspeople from San Bernardino, California